Tone Gunn Frustøl (born 21 June 1975) is a former Norwegian footballer, world champion and Olympic medalist.

She debuted for the Norwegian national team in 1994, and played 32 matches for the national team.

She received a bronze medal at the 1996 Summer Olympics in Atlanta.

Frustøl sat out the 2000 season, but returned to Asker for 2001 after God told her to. She later signed for Amazon Grimstad in 2006 but was one of four players to be summarily dismissed in mid season, due to a sudden cash crisis.

International goals
Scores and results list Norway's goal tally first.

References

External links
 
 
  

1975 births
Living people
Norwegian women's footballers
Footballers at the 1996 Summer Olympics
Olympic footballers of Norway
Olympic bronze medalists for Norway
Olympic medalists in football
Norway women's international footballers
1995 FIFA Women's World Cup players
1999 FIFA Women's World Cup players
FIFA Women's World Cup-winning players
Amazon Grimstad players
Asker Fotball (women) players
FK Donn players
SK Brann Kvinner players
Toppserien players
Norwegian Christians
Medalists at the 1996 Summer Olympics
Women's association football defenders
Women's association football midfielders
People from Asker
Sportspeople from Viken (county)